Eamon Doyle or Eamonn Doyle (same pronunciation) may refer to: 

Eamon (singer) (Eamon Jonathan Doyle), American R&B and hip hop singer-songwriter and harmonicist
Eamon N. Doyle, geologist for The Burren and the Cliffs of Moher, and painter, Ireland
Eamonn Doyle,  Irish photographer and music producer